Guigang railway station is a railway station located in Gangbei District, Guigang, Guangxi, China.

History
The station opened on 1 July 1956. On 6 January 2011, a new cargo station opened.

References 

Railway stations in Guangxi
Railway stations in China opened in 1956